La Savina or La Sabina is a port village in Formentera, on the Balearic Islands, off eastern Spain.

The Far de la Savina lighthouse is located nearby.

External links

Populated places in Formentera
Mediterranean port cities and towns in Spain
Lighthouses in the Balearic Islands